Yann David (born 15 April 1988 in Lyon, France) is a French professional rugby union centre and winger currently playing for Castres Olympique in the Top 14. He played two seasons for Bourgoin-Jallieu before joining the toulousians. He is 1.85m tall and weighs 105 kg. David studied at the private school St.Joseph Bourgoin-Jallieu. He has also participated for Dieux du stade in 2007. He played 30 matches for Bourgoin scoring 6 tries before joining Toulouse in 2009. In 2010 he was a replacement for the final as Toulouse won the Heineken Cup.

David made his debut for the France national team on March 9, 2008 against Italy in the 2008 Six Nations Championship. He was also included in the French team for the 2009 end of year rugby tests.

He is the son of Javelin Thrower Monika Fiafialoto.

On 16 November 2020, David would leave Castres to join Top 14 rivals Bayonne on a two-year deal from the 2021-22 season

External links

Player Profile by lequipe.fr
lesexperts stats
scrum.com stat

References

Sportspeople from Lyon
French rugby union players
France international rugby union players
Stade Toulousain players
Rugby union wings
Rugby union centres
1988 births
Living people
Rugby union players from Wallis and Futuna